Kindrick may refer to:

People
 Joel Kindrick, co-founder of the Drama Arts Society at Pacific Union College
 Kim Kindrick, actor in the 2006 film The Cutting Edge: Going for the Gold
 Kindrick Carter, competed at the 2016 Winter Youth Olympics for United States
 Sophia Kindrick Alcorn (1883–1967), American educator
 William D. Kindrick, American political candidate; see 1844 and 1845 United States House of Representatives elections
 Will Kindrick, American filmmaker

Other
 Dep. Chief Diane Kindrick, a character in an episode of Stalker played by Lee Garlington
 Kindrick Legion Field, a baseball field in Montana

See also
 Bill Kindricks (1946–2015), American football player
 Kindricks Bay, Southeast Alaska; see List of shipwrecks in 1958
 Kendrick (disambiguation)